Ancient Joe is a comic book series created by Scott Morse and published by Dark Horse Comics in 2002.

References

External links
Ancient Joe @ comicbookdb

Dark Horse Comics titles